Vijay Ishwarlal Pawar, (born 23 May 1973) 
better known by his stage name V.I.P., is an Indian standup comedian and TV actor. His father is also a comedian. His biggest dream is to get his name entered in the Guinness Book of Records for his talent of mimicking animal voices.

Career

He started his television career in 2007 with Comedy Circus on Sony Entertainment Television. He has appeared in several Television  shows like  in (2012–2013) Comedy Circus Ke Ajoobe , Comedy Circus - Kaante Ki Takkar (TV Mini-Series) 2008, Comedy Circus 2 (TV Mini-Series) 2008 , Comedy Circus Ke Superstars (TV Series) 2010, Comedy Circus Ka Jadoo (TV Series) 2010, Comedy Circus Ke Tansen (TV Series) 2011. In 2008, VIP won the second season of the comedy reality contest show Comedy Circus on Sony TV with his partner Juhi Parmar. The duo of V.I.P. and Swapnil Joshi were finalists in the first season of the show in 2007. He started his film career with the multi-starrer blockbuster Bol Bachchan (2012). Since then he has also done films like Hum Sab Ullu Hain (2015), Sajan Re Phir Jhooth Mat Bolo (2017 – 2018), Yeh Kaisa Tigdam (2018) and most recently Zindagi Tumse (2019). V.I.P. is well known for his mimicry. He can do instant mimicry of more than 150 actors of the Bollywood. He didn't have much success in Bollywood.

Filmography

Television

 Comedy Circus (Sony TV) - 2007, 2008 and 2010
 Dekh India Dekh (Sony TV)  - 2009
 Nautanki The Comedy Theatre (Colors)
 The Great Indian Family Drama (Sab TV) 
 Comedy Nights
 Comedy Classes (Life OK)
 Comedy Nights Bachao (Colors - 2015)
 Zindagi Tumse (2019 ) director Tariq Bhat
 Bhakharwadi (2019) as himself (Cameo)

References

Male actors from Mumbai
Living people
Indian male television actors
Indian stand-up comedians
Male actors in Hindi television
1973 births